The Greek god Hermes, messenger of the Gods in the Greek mythology, is the representation chosen, in 1860, by the Kingdom of Greece to illustrate its first postal stamps.

The first type, the "large Hermes head", was issued in October 1861, and stayed in circulation up to 1886, it was then replaced by the second type, the "small Hermes head".

The "large Hermes head" stamps, have been reissued, overprinted, in 1900 and 1901 in order to mitigate the delay of shipment of the stamps of the third type, the "flying Hermes" by the British printer J. P. Segg & C°.

In 1902, a fourth type showing Hermes effigy was issued for international "metal payment".

Finally, in 1912, a fifth type showing various Hermes representations was issued and stayed in circulation up to 1926.

Starting early 1920s, the subjects used to illustrate the Greek postal stamps are becoming diversified and let down the Hermes effigy.

The "large Hermes head" (1860–1901)
The postal stamps of the "large Hermes head" type are issued in application of the law of 1853 on the stamping of the mail by the sender and by this of May 24, 1860 on the postal rates.
A decree, dated on the following June 10, announced the choice of Hermes, messenger of the Gods in the Greek mythology as the effigy of the stamps. The stamps depict a profile of the Greek messenger god Hermes (Mercury) in a frame strongly resembling that used for contemporary stamps of France.

The nine values of the stamps of the "large Hermes head" are printed during more than twenty years (from 1861 to 1882) from the same nine typographic plates and stayed in circulation for 25 years (from 1861 to 1886) before to be used again, overprinted, in 1900–1901. The first set was issued on October 1, 1861. It consisted of seven denominations (1, 2, 5, 10, 20, 40 and 80 lepta). The 30 and 60 lepta stamps were introduced in 1876.

The "large Hermes head" stamps are non perforated, with the exception of the two overprinted sets of 1900–1901, in imperforate sheets of 150 stamps.The individual stamps were separated at the counter using scissors, resulting in defects in a large proportion of them (cutting off part of the image). However unofficial perforations were produced locally. The most commonly found is the so-called Athens perforation (11½).

The mock-up, the dies, the die-proofs and the plate-proofs (1860 and 1861) 
The drawing of the mock-up, the engraving of the dies as well as the manufacturing of the typographic plates of the first seven values have been realised between July 1860 and September 1861 by the Chief Engraver of the Paris Mint: Désiré-Albert Barre (1818–1878).

For the creation of the first Greek stamp, Désiré-Albert Barre was inspired by the two first stamp types of France designed from 1848, by his father, Jacques-Jean Barre : the "République" and "Présidence" types or "Cérès" and "Napoléon".

Désiré-Albert Barre started by engraving the necessary dies for the manufacturing of the typographic plates. As an engraver and to validate his work, he printed four types of die-proofs, two types of progressive die-proofs and two types of final die-proofs.

Then he manufactured also the seven typographic plates of the first seven values of the "large Hermes head", using the method developed in 1858–1859: the "direct striking in the coining press" method.

To determine the choice of the inks and the papers and as well to calibrate the printing press, Désiré-Albert Barre realized, with the printer Ernest Meyer, about a hundred of different types of plate-proofs and imprimaturs for all the values.

The Paris printings (October 1861) 
The first type of the Greek stamps with the Hermes effigy, the head profile turned to the right is issued on October 1, according to the Julian calendar, still in usage at that time in Greece, or October 13, 1861, according to the Gregorian calendar adopted by the majority of the European countries in 1582, to the exception of the orthodox ones. Greece finally adopted the Gregorian calendar in 1923.

The first type of the Greek stamp is named "large Hermes head" in order to differentiate it from the following one, issued in 1886, and named "small Hermes head".

The seven values issued in October 1861 have been printed in Paris by the printer Ernest Meyer, on sheets of 150 stamps (10 X 15). These seven values are the 1 lepton, 2, 5, 10, 20, 40 & 80 lepta:

The Paris issues are easily recognisable by the extreme finesse of their printing on satin papers, lightly tinted, of a very good quality.

The shading lines of the cheek and the nape are thin and discontinued. In particular, the wavy lines and the points in the spandrels are clearly visible and printed with an extreme finesse.

Finally, only the 10 lepta carry "control numbers" on its back. These numbers are 8 mm high, when all the following ones, printed in Athens on any value, will be 6.5 mm high.

Quantities printed in Paris in 1861:

Classification of Paris printings 

 1861 - The first seven denominations, 10 lepta with control numbers (Scott 1–7).
 1876 - 30 and 60 lepta (Scott 49–50). Issued to harmonize international postal rates with those of the Union Genérale des Postes (later Universal Postal Union), which Greece joined in 1875.

The Athens printings (November 1861 to 1882) 
Then, and as soon as in November 1861, the printings have been done in Athens from the same seven typographic plates sent, by Désiré-Albert Barre to the Greek postal administration during the summer 1861.

Printing after printing, the technical improvement of the Greek printers, as well as the fouling of the typographic plates can be seen.

The printing of the control numbers at the back of the stamps is becoming a constant, except for the two smallest values, the 1 lepton, brown, and the 2 lepta, bistre. All further printings took place in Athens and the stamps remained in use until the introduction of the Small Hermes heads in 1886–1888.

The printings were done "on demand", and the colour shades evolved within a very broad spectrum.

As well, several different quality of papers have been used during the Athens period of printing (from 1861 to 1882).
Hence, it exists a very large diversity of "large Hermes head" stamp printings. The most advanced studies on the subject: Pemberton, Groom, Dorning Beckton, Brunel, Nicolaïdès, de Smeth, Kohl Handbuck, Constantinidès, Bellas, Coundouros, Basel..., are describing them in details.

The classification of Yvert et Tellier, resumed and completed by Orestis Vlastos in the Vlastos catalogues and by Michael Tseriotis in the Hellas/Karamitsos catalogues, allow us to go through them:

The first Athens printings (November 1861 to April 1862) 

The stocks of stamps received from Paris became empty very quickly, in particular in the main post offices (Athens, Piraeus, Syros or Patras...), though starting the month of November 1861, the Greek postal administration was obliged to start to use the typographic plates received from Paris, in order to print its own first sheets of stamps.

The Greek workers were far to have the level of experience of the French ones who were used to printing methods since several generations... Thus, the result was disappointing, the background of the medallion was not uniform anymore, the Hermes head was very often circled by a whitish halo and the four spandrels were also often "unclear". The shadow lines of the cheek and the nape are now continued and thicker than on the Paris printings.

Nevertheless, these stamps, printed with various methods ("hard printing", au blanchet, with mixed technics...) are, for those printed with the "hard printing" method, without any "foulage", have a strong character, due to the density of the used inks, and to their contrast. So, they are as popular and studied, as the Paris printings.

Some of them are perfectly printed and are as fine as the Paris printings when some others are really coarse, it's the reason why the catalogues are classifying them in two categories the fine and the coarse printings.

As for all the Athens printings, these various issues identification is only possible, for sure, by using the "control numbers" at the back of the stamps that are mandatory for a correct classification.

For the first Athens printings, the "control numbers" are used for the first time, so they are perfectly clear and well printed with the downstrokes and the upstrokes really distinct and very finely printed.

As well, the "control number" "5" of the 5 lepta value is different from the one which will be used for all the following Athens printings up to 1880.

The famous 20 lepta without "control figures", with the "quadrillé" or solid background (Yvert/Vlastos n° 9 & Karamitsos n° 8), are belonging to these printings.

The issue is usually called "Athens "provisoire" ("temporary") issue". Indeed, one can believe that these stamps, due to the poor quality of their printing for some of them, were plate-proofs done by the Greek printers to initiate themselves to these new technics... But the stamps demand was so strong that the Greek postal administration decided to use them for regular postal service anyway... for the joy of the future philatelists.

The printing of the first Athens printings is ending in April 1862.

The regular or consecutive Athens printings (May 1862 to 1867) 
Starting May 1862, the Greek printers stopped totally the usage of the hard printing method ("tirage à sec"), and used another one, (named the soft printing method or "au blanchet") much more easier to put in place.

In order to increase the contrast between the dark and the light parts of the printing, a blanket was inserted below the sheet to be printed and the typographic plate. This method allowed to get much better overall results without however reaching the quality of the first Athens fine printings or obviously, the one of the Paris printings...  This method was giving a strong "foulage" to the stamps, in particular at the shadow lines of the neck, with, very often, a relief ("foulage") visible on the back of the stamp.

At the beginning of these printings (1862–1863), the shadow lines of the cheek are continued and straight before becoming ticker after...

The "control numbers" are fine but lighter than on the first Athens printings.

The so-called  "cleaned plates" printings (1868 to 1869) 
In 1868, the printings are becoming pale and dull, and without contrast, but the impression is fine.

For a long period of time, one believed that it was due to the cleaning of the typographic plates as the named of these printings is referring to. In fact, it is not the case at all, as the typographic plates have been cleaned only in 1870. This pale/dull aspect is coming from the usage of a new blanket ("blanchet") much thicker as demonstrated by Louis Basel.

The "control numbers" are becoming thicker and are not as fine as on the previous printings...

The "control numbers" errors are very frequent in particular, the "1" inverted for the 10 lepta or the "2" inverted for the 20 lepta as well as the "0" inverted for the two values.

The special printing or the new "mise en train" (1870) 
In 1870, the Greek postal administration has received a new printing press from Germany.

The German worker(s) who came in Athens to install this new machine have also done a new "mise en train" and have printed, using the hard method ("à sec"), sheets of the two most used values: (1 lepton for the newspapers and 20 lepta for the domestic letters, up to 15 grams).

The result was once more, very disappointing: the impression was fine but, the shadow lines of the cheek are very short, in particular for the 1 lepton which is named "the shaved" by the collectors.

For the 20 lepta, the spandrels are whiten and the head is quite often circled by a whitish halo. The "control numbers" are milky-blue or deep-blue and always clear by are becoming even more thicker...

The printings on the so-called "inferior quality papers" (1871 & 1872) 

From the beginning of the 1870s years, the supply of the papers from France has been stopped due to the Franco-Prussian war. The Greek mint started to use papers from unknown provenance of relative good quality but with half-transparent and regular "clouds" visible by transparency on the light.

The usage of the "blanchet" was substituted to the hard printing method of the previous issue and will continue to be used for all the following issues up to the end of the printings, in 1882.

The shadow lines of the cheek and the nape of the neck of the Hermes head are long and uniform but thicker than on the previous issues.

The "control numbers" of this issue are clear, well printed and darker than the previous issues, but they are also heavier due to the usage of the same printing plate since ten years.

The most famous stamp of the "large Hermes head" collection is a variety of this issue: this is the 40 lepta of the same shade as the "control numbers" of the typical stamp of this same value. A single sheet has been printed and only 13 individual stamps have survived, as far as we know today (Yvert n° 22Ba, Karamitsos n° 36a). These include 11 single stamps, one stamp on a fragment with an arrival postmark "Constantinople - Turkey" and one on an entire letter to Larnaca, Cyprus. All are cancelled with either a Type I dotted stamp "2" or a type II postmark "Piraeus", on 12, 13 and 14 July 1871. They were nicknamed "Solferino" in reference to the famous bloody Battle of Solferino of 1859, between the French-Sardinian coalition and the Austrian army in Northern Italy.

The printings on meshed papers (1871 to 1876) 
Starting the end of 1871, the papers used are of less and less good quality. They are very thin, almost transparent and "fragile" (the front drawing is visible from the back) and in the light by transparency, they are showing a mesh/tram of regular holes.

The "control numbers" are again even thicker...
Here again, many errors are found.

As these papers were absorbing the ink more than the previous ones, many shades variations are existing, and some of them are quite surprising and are more numerous than on the previous issues.

The printings of the new values : 30 & 60 lepta (1876 & 1877) 

In 1875, following Greece entrance to the Union Générale des Postes (U.G.P.), ancestor of the Universal Postal Union (U.P.U.), the Greek postal administration launched two new values (30 & 60 Lepta ).

From the same die used in 1861 to build the typographic plates of the first seven values, Désiré-Albert Barre has created the plates for the 30 lepta (brown) and the 60 lepta (green) necessary for the international mail.

Unlike the seven first typographic plates realised in 1861 with the "direct striking in the coining press" method, these two new plates have been manufactured, under the supervision of Désiré-Albert Barre, with the "Galvanoplasty-type" method, by the company: Charles-Dierrey, 6 & 12, rue Notre-Dame-des-Champs in Paris.

These two values have been printed the printer J. Claye & Cie, 7, rue Saint Benoît, in Paris.

As the Paris printings of 1861, this printing is very fine. These two new values do not have any "control number" on their back.

Like in 1861, after a first printing of the two values, done in Paris, all the following ones have been done in Athens with the same typographic plates sent from Paris.

Quantities printed in Paris (1876):

The cream papers printings with "control numbers" (1875 to 1880) 
The last printings done from 1875 to 1882 are remarkable by their paper of cream colour, very easily recognisable by looking at the back of the stamp.

The typographic plates have not been cleaned for several years, the printing is more and more heavy.

After fifteen years of usage, the "control numbers" plates is giving very thick figures without any distinction between the downstrokes and the upstrokes.

A very large number of "control numbers" errors is existing in this issue. The "control numbers" are disappearing in 1880 for the last two issues.

Due to the fouling of the typographic plates, stamps, printed at the late 1870s/beginning 1880s, can be found with very coarse printing.

Comparison of two 1 Lepton printed from the same typographic plate:
 The first one is from the Paris printings (1861),
 The second one is from one of the printings on cream papers of the late 1870s
The difference is due to the fouling of the typographic plate...

The cream papers printings without "control numbers" (1880 to 1882) 
Around the end of the 1870s or at the beginning of the 1880s, the plates are finally cleaned and are printing stamps with an outstanding finesse.
The papers are the same as the previous issue but without any "control number" at the back of the stamp.

The change of colours (1882) 
In 1882, the change de colours of the stamps for the domestic rate (20 lepta) and the international rate (30 lepta) is becoming mandatory in order to comply to the U.P.U. (Union Postale Universelle) new rules.

The 20 lepta are pink (aniline) and red (carmine), the 30 lepta is blue.

These stamps do not have "control number" on their back.

The nine values of the "large Hermes head" have been printed from the same nine typographic plates (one per value) during more than twenty years (from 1861 to 1882).

If the final printing is dated in 1882, the stamps of the "large Hermes head" stayed in circulation up to 1886 and were then replaced by the new type of stamp: the "small Hermes head".

Classification of Athens printings 
In August & September 1861 the printing plates were transferred to Athens and subsequent printings were made there, at the National Printing Office.

The same plates remained in use up to 1882, resulting in a number of varieties due to plates becoming worn and then cleaned, changes in the exact method of printing and using several different kinds of paper.

Classification of Athens printings is not always easy and there are substantial differences between the various catalogues and specialized publications. Generally the following scheme is accepted, while most experts expand it further with more categories, especially for the period 1861–1862.

The Scott catalogue numbers are given for each issue.

 1861–1862 - Provisional prints (coarse and fine prints) (Scott 8–15)
 1862–1867 - Consecutive Athens prints (Scott 16–22)
 1868–1869 & 1873 for the 80 lepta - Cleaned plates issues (Scott 23–29)
 1870 - Special 1 lepton and 20 lepta issues known as "shaved"(Scott 30–31)
 1871–1872 - Prints on paper of inferior quality (Scott 32–37)
 1872–1876 - Meshed paper prints(Scott 38–42)
 1876 - Paris issue of 30 and 60 lepta
 1876–1877 - Athens prints of 30 and 60 lepta (Scott 51–52)
 1875–1880 - Prints on yellowish or cream paper (Scott 43–48)
 1880–1882 - Prints on yellowish or cream paper, without control numbers (Scott 53–58)
 1882 - Change of colors prints of 20 & 30 lepta

Colours and other characteristics 

 1 lepton - brown, without control numbers
 2 lepta - bistre, without control numbers
 5 lepta - green, emerald or light green
 10 lepta - yellowish orange, often on light blue paper
 20 lepta - various shades of blue, also aniline rose and carmine in the 1880–1886 issues
 30 lepta - olive brown, ultramarine after 1880
 40 lepta - violet, often on light blue paper, lilac-brown, grey-flesh
 60 lepta - blue-green
 80 lepta - carmine, carmine rose

The overprinted "large Hermes head" (1900 to 1901) 

In September 1900, due to the shipment delay of the new issue of the "flying Hermes" by the English printer J.P. Segg & C°, the Greek postal administration decided to reuse the old stocks on the anterior issues, including those of the "large Hermes head"

(these overprints also exist on the "Olympic 1896" and on the "small Hermes head" issues).

They are overprinted "AM", in black, for "Αξια Μεταλλικη" ("Metal Value") and with values in drachms.

The usage of these stamps was reserved to the postal parcels and to postal orders ("mandats") and were paid in "gold drachm".

They are really very rare on non-philatelic documents.

In October 1900, another issue was launched but that time for common usage, the values are in lepta and drachm.

It exists a very large number of variety of these surcharges, such as those of the: "narrow 0", "large 0", "small space", "large space".

All these overprint issues have been removed from the selling on June 30, 1901, when the "flying Hermes" issue has been finally shipped from London.

The "control numbers" of the "large Hermes head"  
The majority of the "large Hermes head" has also the facial value printed on the back of the stamp:
 The 10 lepta of the Paris printing (numbers of 8 mm high),
 The 5, 10, 20, 40 & 80 lepta of all the Athens printings, to the exception of the last two ones (numbers of 6.5 mm high).

Not any single official document has been found so far allowing us to understand the exact purpose of these numbers. Several hypotheses are possible: limitation of falsification of the stamps or, easier control of the production of the stamps... This second hypothesis is considered by the specialists of the "large Hermes head" stamp as the most probable. This is the reason why these figures are commonly called "control numbers".
The unique writing comment existing, to this date, about these "control numbers" is the one that can be found in the post scriptum of a letter of Désiré-Albert Barre written to the Greek administration for the second shipment of the stamps and plates to Athens on September 11, 1861. In that letter the French Chief Engraver is writing: "The 10 lepta stamps, the last produced, carry on their back the printed value: 10 lepta in large sized numbers. I believed that it was necessary to apply this innovation to these stamps, this idea came to me late and which appears to offer some great advantages.".

The "control numbers" errors of the "large Hermes head" 
A very large number of "control numbers" errors has been identified:.
 One or the two digit(s) inverted,
 Digits swapped each other,
 Uneven digits,
 Double digit(s),
 Large space between the two digits,
 Displaced digit(s),
 Digits printed on the front of the stamp,
 ...
The number of the different types of errors, without of their combination,  is very important and exists for all the printings. New "control numbers" errors are still regularly discovered by philatelists.

It could easily justify a specialised collection by itself!

The "control numbers" errors of the 10 lepta of the Paris printing 
These are all the referenced "control numbers" errors of the 10 lepta of the Paris printing, as well as their position on the sheet of 150 stamps:

The "control numbers" errors of the Athens printings 
This is just a sample of some "control numbers" errors that can be found in the Athens printings:

The plate flaws of the "large Hermes head" 
Starting with the Paris printing, in 1861, plate flaws are found, coming from small imperfections of some of the "clichés" of the typographic plates.

Some of these plate flaws are native and have appeared during the manufacturing process of the plates (see the first three illustrations below), and some others are appearing, coming either from wrong manipulations (see the last three illustrations, below), or from a dirtying of the plates (ink spots), during the life of the plates. In this last case they could also disappear after the cleaning of the plates (see the two 1 lepton below).

This is just a sample of some plate flaws that can be found on the "large Hermes head" stamps:

The plate flaws exist for all the values of all the printings and their number is very important. Here again, a specific collection is totally justifiable.

The forgeries/fakes of the "large Hermes head" stamps 
As all the classical stamps, the "large Hermes head" have been counterfeited and that as early as the 1860s.
It exists a large number of fakes done during the 19th century and during the first part of the 20th century.
These stamps have been the target of forgers, including Erasmo Oneglia, Jean de Sperati and A. Alisaffi.

This is just a sample of some forgeries/fakes of the "large Hermes head" stamps:

All the printings of the plate-proofs and the stamps of "large Hermes head" have the first wavy line broken at their base in the north-west spandrel.

It's also the case for the tenth wavy line of the same spandrel (see the illustration below).

These breaks are coming from a problem that happened to the final die or to a service die during either the process of:
 Striking, or,
 Hardening.
Indeed, these breaks are not appearing on the progressive and final proofs (to the exception of the only numeral proof known today and which have been realised at the end of the process).

It exists the same type of "small problems" on some French classical stamps build in the middle of the 19th century, in the same French Mint, under the responsibility of the Chief Engravers: Jacques-Jean Barre , then his son, Désiré-Albert Barre,  who has also realised the dies and the typographic plates of the "large Hermes head" of Greece.

The existence or the absence of these two breaks are warrantying if the "large Hermes head" stamp is genuine or not in almost all the cases....

Only the Jean de Sperati fakes, which have been realised with a photo-lythography method, and which are then a picture of an original stamp, are presenting these two same breaks at the same places...

The postal stationeries - "Cartes-correspondance" (1876-1900)

The Paris printing (April 1876) 

In 1875, at the same time of the 30 & 60 lepta stamps order, the Greek postal administration asked to Désiré-Albert Barre to realize the necessary equipment to print the first postal stationery (carte-correspondence) of the Kingdom.

For the realization of the die of the effigy of the stamp of the postal stationery, the Chief-Engraver took the same medallion-die used, in 1861, to create the large Hermes head stamps and engraved a new framework (see the illustrations of the pre-project and the mock-up, below).

Like for the 30 & 60 lepta stamps, the Chief-Engraver supervised the company: Charles-Dierrey, 6 & 12, rue Notre-Dame-des-Champs in Paris, on the manufacturing of the postal stationery typographic plate, composed of 24 pure copper "clichés", by using a galvanic method.

And like for the 30 & 60 lepta stamps, the sheets were printed in typography on Bristol paper, by the company: J. Claye & Cie, 7, rue Saint Benoît, in Paris, on April 13 & 14, 1876.

5.000, or 8.000, sheets of 24 postal stationaries (cartes-correspondence) with 15 lepta value have been printed. The documents exchanged between Désiré-Albert Barre and the Greek government, are indeed contradictories regarding the exact quantity ordered: 5.000 or 8.000 sheets (?)...

It exists two types of the 1876 Paris printing postal stationery:
 The type I: The horizontal line under "Carte-correspondance" is of 14,5 mm length, and,
 The type II: The horizontal line under "Carte-correspondance" is of 16,0 mm length.

The first Athens printing (1878) 

After the stock depletion of the Paris printing, a second emission, of the 15 lepta value and in blue, has been printed in Athens in 1878.

As for the stamps of 1861 and 1876, the printings done in Athens are coarser than the ones of the Paris printing.

Here also, it exists two types with the same characteristics of those of the Paris printing.

The Belgium printing (July 1st 1883) 

At the same time as the printing of the values of the 25, lepta, 50 lepta and of the 1 drachme of the small Hermes head (see below), the Greek postal administration asked the "Atelier du timbre" of Malines in Belgium to print the postal stationaries of the values of 5 & 10 lepta in blue, red and grey-green colors.

Due to the extensive use of the 10 lepta value, double postal stationeries of this value have been also printed.

The second Athens printings (1890–1900) 

Starting 1890, the Greek postal administration printed in Athens the postal stationeries of the values of 5 & 10 lepta in blue, black and red colors.

The same plates than the ones of the first Athens printings were used. The printings are even coarser than the first Athens printing of 1878.

The "small Hermes head" (1886 to 1899) 

The second type of the Greek posts is also with the Hermes effigy. It is called the "small Hermes head" and has been issued from 1886 to 1899.
They depict Hermes in profile, but with a smaller head and a rounder helmet. The design was by Henri Hendrickx (1817–1894) and it was engraved by Albert Doms, Atelier de Timbre, Belgium.
The typographic plates counted 300 stamps, sub-divided in six panels of 50 stamps (5 × 10) mounted in two columns of three rows.

The stamps of the "small Hermes head" are non-perforated as well as perforated, with different perforations (13 & ½, 11 & ½ and 13 & ¼).
It exists also stamps with perforation of 15, but unofficially, probably perforated with a sewing machine inside the premise of the Amfissa Branch of the National bank of Greece. They are called the Amfissa perforated.

Like the "large Hermes head" stamps, the "small Hermes head" stamps have been also overprinted in 1900 with the two overprinted issues (Metal value and common usage).

The 50 lepta stamp was not reprinted. The stamps were produced using the gravure method, using printing plates of 300 stamps in 6 groups of 50 stamps.  Initially the sheets were imperforate. Perforated versions, initially 13½ and later 11½, became available in 1891.

The Belgium printings (1886 to 1888) 
The first printing has been done at the "atelier du timbre" in Malines, in Belgium. The first three denominations (25 lepta, 50 lepta and 1 drachma) were issued on April 1. The remaining denominations (1 lepton, 2, 5, 10, 20 and 40 lepta) were issued on February 1, 1888.

Value and colour of the nine values of the Belgium printings of the "small Hermes head":

The Athens printings (1889 to 1899) 
The consecutive printings have been done in Athens and are sub-divided in two main periods:
 The 1st period, from March 1889 to March 1891, with two types of paper, and,
 the 2nd period, from March 1891 to April 1896, with two other types of paper.

The first Olympic games issue (1896) 

In 1896, Greece issued its first commemorative stamps set for the first summer Olympic games of 1896 of the modern era.
The stamps of this issue have been designed in Paris. The French engraver Louis-Eugène Mouchon realised the dies.

The issue is counting twelve values representing allegories of the antic Olympic games.
One of these twelve values, the two drachms in large format, represents a Hermes statue inspired by Praxiteles.

After 1899

The "Flying Hermes" (1901) 

In 1901, a fourth representation of Hermes is appearing on the post-stamps of the Kingdom of Greece. The utilised figure that time is a statue from the sculptor of the 16th century, Jean Boulogne, or Giovanni da Bologna or, Giambologna: the "flying Hermes".
This fourteen values issue, perforated in three different types (a, b et c) has been realised by the English printer J. P. Segg & C° in London.

Value and colour of the fourteen values of the "flying Hermes" set:

The Hermes with Metal Values (1902) 

In 1902, the Greek postal administration issued a set of five stamps with the same effigy, perforated 13 & ½, for the payment in medal money (golden drachma) for the international parcels shipment with the mention AM for "Αξια Μεταλλιχη" for "Metal Value".
These stamps have been printed in England by Perkins Bacon & C°.

The five values are:
 Le 5 lepta, orange,
 Le 25 lepta, green,
 Le 50 lepta, blue,
 Le 1 drachm, red, and,
 Le 2 drachms, brown.

The 50 lepta, red is a "non-émis".

This set was issued for the international mailing, in particular for the parcels and the postal orders ("mandats"), but will be also used for the common usage.
The complete sheet was counting one hundred stamps.

The definitive sets with the effigy of Hermes (1911 to 1926) 
In 1911, a new set, with various effigies of the God Hermes, was issued. The stamps are perforated in zigzag (13 X 13 & ¼).
This new set is initially, in 1911, printed by using the line-engraving technic ("taille douce"), then reissued in 1919, still in line-engraving, and then again in 1919–1923 but that time in lithography, and finally, still in lithography in 1926 (Vienna emission) .
All these issues have been overprinted in many cases up to 1920:
 in 1912–1913: overprinted ΕΛΛΗΝΙΚΙ ΔΙΟΙΚΗΣΙΣ, with black and red inks, reading-up and reading-down,
 in 1912–1913: overprinted ΛΗΜΝΟΣ, with black and red inks, et,
 in 1916: overprinted ΕΤ for Ελληνικά Ταχυδομεία (Hellenic posts), with black and red inks.

Value, colour and type of the sixteen stamps of common usage set, printed in "taille douce" in 1911 :

Notes and references

Bibliography (Large Hermes Heads)
 Natalis Rondot, Les timbres-poste – Royaume de Grèce, Le Magasin Pittoresque, XXXIIème année, Paris 1864.
 Arthur E. Glasewald, Die Postwerthzeichen von Griechenland, Gössnitz, 1896.
 Walter Dorning Beckton, The stamps of Greece, London 1897.
 A. Reinheimer, Concise description of the essays of Martin Schroeder, Leipzig 1903.
 Georges Brunel, Les émissions des timbres grecs, Paris 1909.
 Percival Loines Pemberton, The stamps of Greece, Philatelic journal of Great Britain, 1911 & 1912.
 N. S. Nicolaïdès, Histoire de la création du timbre grec, Paris 1923.
 Theodore Groom, The controls of the 20 lepta and their bearing on the classification of Greek stamps of the first type, Philotelia n° 3 & 4 of March 1924.
 Paul de Smeth, Grèce, Premier type, Histoire, Classement, Essais, Oblitérations, Amiens 1925.
 Alex. G. Argyropoulos und Dr. Herbert Mund:,Griechenland. In: Kohl Briefmarken-Handbug, Berlin 1931.
 Tryphon Constantinidès, Etude sur les timbres-poste de la Grèce - 1ère Partie, Hellenic Philatelic Society Athens 1933.
 Docteur Pierre Bouvet, La commande à la Monnaie de Paris des timbres grecs à tête de Mercure, Paris 1937.
 Tryphon Constantinidès, Etude sur les timbres-poste de la Grèce - 2ème Partie, Hellenic Philatelic Society, Athens 1937.
 Elias Silberstein & Robert O. Truman, Translation from the Kohl Briefmarken Handbuch of Alex G. Argyropulos & Dr. Herbert Munk of 1929, New York 1943–1944 & 1950.
 Nicolas Garas, Grèce - Grosse tête de Mercure - Les variétés des planches des timbres-poste (1861 - 1882), Athens 1955.
 George M. Photiadis, The first Athens issue of the large Hermes heads of Greece, London 1965.
 George M. Photiadis, The imprint "Typographie Ernest Meyer, Rue de Verneuil 22, à Paris" on the sheets of the large Hermes heads of Greece printed in Paris (1861), London 1969.
 Henri Regnoul-Barre, Les Barre, graveurs généraux des Monnaies, créateurs des premiers timbres-poste français et grecs, Paris 1978.
 Ulysse Bellas, La tête de Mercure: Généralités et reconstruction de la planche des 20 lepta, Paris 1978.
 Jean-François Brun, Les premiers timbres grecs ou la mystérieuse histoire de Mercure, Le Monde des Philatélistes n° 369, Paris 1983.
 Ulysse Bellas, Grèce - La première carte-correspondance, Le Monde des Philatélistes n° 427, Paris 1989.
 Ulysse Bellas, Grèce - L’Emission de 1876 de la Grosse Tête de Mercure, Le Monde des Philatélistes n° 428 & 429, Paris 1989.
 Nicholas Asymakopulos, The plate flaws of the large Hermes heards of greece, 1861 - 1886, USA 1995.
 John G. Coundouros, The control numbers & the classification of the stamps of the large Hermes head, Athens 2000.
 Louis Basel, The Ten Lepta Large Hermes Head Stamp of Greece, Stamford 2001–2005 <https://web.archive.org/web/20151002141114/http://hermesheads.home.comcast.net/~hermesheads/>.
 Anthony B. Virvilis, Handbook of the Hellenic philately, Athens 2003 <http://www.philatelie-epernay.fr/IMG/pdf/97-2-page19a30.pdf>.
 Louis Basel, The Forty Lepta Large Hermes Head Stamp of Greece, Stamford 2004 <https://web.archive.org/web/20151002141114/http://hermesheads.home.comcast.net/~hermesheads/>.
 Louis Basel, The underlay used in printing the Large Hermes head stamps of Greece, Stamford 2005 <https://web.archive.org/web/20151002141114/http://hermesheads.home.comcast.net/~hermesheads/>.
 Nicholas Asymakopulos, The first Greek stamp, USA 2005.
 Jan Mancini, The 1900 Overprints, Vlastos Editions, Athens 2007.
 Louis Fanchini, "Definition of the terms "PROOF" and "ESSAY" and their application to the large Hermes head stamps", Philotelia n° 644 of May/June 2007, pp. 133–145.
 Louis Fanchini, "Large Hermes heads Paris printing: The exact quantities ordered and shipped to Athens", Philotelia n° 646 of September/October 2007, pp. 277–286.
 Michèle Chauvet & Jean-François Brun, Introduction à l'Histoire Postale 1848-1878, Paris 2007.
 Michael Chambers, Messenger of the Gods, Stamp Magazine n° 74–1, January 2008, pp. 44–48.
 Louis Fanchini, Why the so-called "Hulot proofs" do not exist?, Philotelia n° 650 of May/June, 2008, pp. 135–145.
 Louis Fanchini, The essays "Cérès 1858": Why are they an integral part of the Greek philately?, Philotelia n° 652/653 & 654 of September/October, November/December 2008 & January/February 2009, pp. 260–270, 364–374 & 7–16.
 Jean-François Brun, Louis Fanchini, Mario Konialidis & Kyriakos Papathanassiou, The Zante error, Philotelia n° 659 of November/December 2009, n° 662 of May/June 2010, n° 682 of September/October 2014 & n° 685 of March/April 2014, pp. 325–330, 184–186, 269-270 & 68.
 Louis Fanchini, Histoire de grosse tête, Timbres Magazine n° 113 of May 2010, pp. 94 & 95.
 Louis Fanchini, Le premier timbre-poste de Grèce : « la grosse tête d'Hermès », Timbres Magazine n° 114 & 115 of July/August & September 2010, pp. 67–73 & 39–41.
 Bill Ure, Forgeries of Greek stamps of the 19th century, edited by collectio, Athens 2010.
 John G. Coundouros, Large Hermes Head - Characteristic marks of all positions in the plate of the values of 5, 10, 20, 40 & 80 lepta, Thessaloniki 2011.
 Louis Fanchini, The dies and proofs of large Hermes head, Philotelia n° 669 of July/August 2011, pp. 218–240.
 Stavros Andreadis, Edition d'or XXVIII - The Kassandra collection, Corinphila & Heinrich Köhler, Germany, 2011.
 Constantin Mattheos, Introduction to the large Hermes heads of Greece, 1861-1886, Royal Philatelic Society London, 2011.
 Stephano A. Calliga, The stamps of the large Hermes head - Early Athenian period 1861-1863, Athens, 2011.
 Stephano A. Calliga, The stamps of the large Hermes head - 1861-1886, Athens, 2012.
 Vlastos Hellas I (1861–2011), Vlastos Philatelic centre, Athens 2012.
 John Daes (Γιάννης Νταής) Η από και πρός το εξωτερικό αλληλογραφία, 3 volumes, Athens, 2012.
 Hellas Postal Stationery (1876 - 2012) Catalogue - Volume V, edited by Argyris Karamitsos, Thessaloniki 2013.
 Lou Basel, Process for production of the Large Hermes Head progressive proofs, OPUS XIII, 2013, pages 66–68 <https://web.archive.org/web/20151002141114/http://hermesheads.home.comcast.net/~hermesheads/>.
 Louis Fanchini, The Ernest Meyer's imprints on the large Hermes head of Greece and on the Cérès of France, OPUS XIII, 2013, pages 69–84.
 Louis Fanchini, Greece's Large Hermes Head, Stamp & Coin Mart of July 2014, pp. 58–60.
 Kyriakos Papathanasssiou, Scholia and Observations on the large Hermes heads of Greece - 1861/1886, Athens, 2014.
 Michèle Chauvet, Les Tarifs Helléniques des Lettres Internationales - 1861/1878, Paris, 2015.
 John G. Coundouros, The control numbers & the classification of the stamps of the large Hermes head, second édition, Athens 2016.
 Myrsini Vardopoulou, Ελληνικά Γραμματόσημα 1861-1961. Ιστορία-Ιδεολογία-Αισθητική, Athens 2016.
 Hellas Stamp Catalogue & Postal History 2016 - Volume I (1861–1959), edited par Argyris Karamitsos, Thessaloniki 2016.
 Louis Fanchini, The recurrent broken "0" Control Numbers error on the 10 lepta of the large Hermes heads, Paris printing, Philotelia no 703 of March/April 2017, pp. 75–78.
 Louis Fanchini, A new CN error on the 20 lepta of the LHH Consecutive Athens printings, Philotelia no 706 of September/October 2017, pp. 265–266.
 Nikos Karniaoutakis, Large Hermes Heads of Greece - Observations on Identifying and Classifying - The Easier to Follow Value, Mytilene 2019.
 Theofilos Salonidis, The Athens 30 lepta of the 1876-1878 period, Philotelia no 714 of January/February, 2019, pages 6–17, no 715 of March/April, 2019, pages 112–120, no 716 of May/June, 2019, pages 173-180 & no 717 of July/August, 2019, pages 248–254.
 Louis Fanchini, Définition des termes « EPREUVE » et « ESSAI » et leur application à la « grosse tête d’Hermès », Delcampe Magazine n° 28 de juillet/août 2019, pages 20–25. (https://blog.delcampe.net/magazine/delcampe-magazine-28.pdf).
 Michael Kaitatzidis, Large Hermes Heads of Greece - Control numbers errors, Mytilene 2021.
 Louis Fanchini & Theofilos Salonidis, Plate flaw on the 30 lepta - White spot on the base of "Λ" of the word "ΛΕΠΤ", Philotelia n° 728 of May/June 2021, pp 187–189.
 Stavros Andreadis, Édition d'or Volume 60 - The Kassandra collection - 2nd edition, Corinphila & Heinrich Köhler, Germany, 2021.
 Devlan Kruck, The Synergy of France and Greece, Blog of the Museum of Philately, January 25, 2022.
 John Daes, The Greek postal rates 1828-1875, 2 volumes (A & B), Athens, 2022.
 Many articles from various authors, published from 1924 up to now on Philotelia, the bulletin of the Hellenic Philotelic Society (HPS) of Athens, Greece <https://hps.gr/index.php/en/classic/>.

External links (Large Hermes Heads)

General Philately:
 Académie de Philatélie, Académie de Philatélie of France site (in French).
 Hellenic Philatelic Society - HPS of Athens, Hellenic Philatelic Society - HPS of Athens site.
 European Academy of Philatély - AEP, European Academy of Philately - AEP site.
 Royal Philatelic Society of London - RPSL, Royal Philatelic Society of London - RPSL site.
 The Collectors Club - CCNY, The Collectors Club of New York - CCNY site.
 Club Philatélique Français - CPF, Club Philatélique Français - CPF site (in French).
 Association Philatélique Sparnacienne - APS, Association Philatélique Sparnacienne - APS site (in French).
 Hellenic Philatelic Society of the Netherlands - HPS-NL, Hellenic Philatelic Society of the Netherlands - HPS-NL site.
 Fédération Française des Associations Philatéliques - FFAP, Fédération Française des Associations Philatéliques - FFAP site (in French).
 Club Philatélique et Cartophile de Truchtersheim , Club Philatélique et Cartophile de Truchtersheim site - CPCT.
 Philatélie Hellénique - Par passion pour la Grèce  (in French).

General Philately - Literature:
 Présentation of the index of the Greek philatelic literature by Anthony Virvilis - Association Philatélique Sparnacienne - APS (2007, in French)..

Large Hermes Head - Traditional Philately:
 Louis Basel, Hermes Heads, specialised site.
 Article: Définition des termes « épreuve » et « essai » et leur application à la « grosse tête d'Hermès » - Association Philatélique Sparnacienne - APS (2007, in French).
 Study: Tirages de Paris de la « grosse tête d'Hermès » de Grèce, Quantités exactes commandées et livrées à Athènes - Association Philatélique Sparnacienne - APS (2007, in French).
 Conference summary: Le tirage de Paris de la « grosse tête d'Hermès » (1er/13 octobre 1861) - Académie de Philatélie (2009, In French).
 Presentation summary on pièces: Erreurs d'impression des « chiffres de contrôle » de la « grosse tête d'Hermès » - Académie de Philatélie (2009, In French).
 Presentation summary on pièces: Le poinçon original du médaillon de la « grosse tête d'Hermès » - Académie de Philatélie (2009, In French).
 Exposition : "Epreuves et essais de la grosse tête d´Hermès de Grèce" - Fédération Française des Associations Philatéliques - FFAP (2009, In French).
 Presentation summary on pièces: Galvano du 30 lepta (1875-1876) de la « grosse tête d'Hermès » - Académie de Philatélie (2010, In French).
 Conference summary:  Le timbre de la « grosse tête d'Hermès » de Grèce - Académie de Philatélie (2010, In French).
 Conference: La « grosse tête d'Hermès » à l'Association Philatélique Sparnacienne - APS (2011, In French) - CPCT site.
 Study: The Dies and Proofs of the “Large Hermes Head” of Greece - Hellenic Philatelic Society of the Netherlands (2011).
 Conference summary:  « Chiffres de contrôle » des timbres de la « grosse tête d'Hermès » de Grèce - Académie de Philatélie (2013, In French).
 Conference summary:  Les poinçons, épreuves et essais de la « grosse tête d'Hermès » de Grèce - Académie de Philatélie (2013, In French).
 Study: The Ernest Meyer’s imprints on the "large Hermes heads" of Greece and on the "Cérès" of France - Hellenic Philatelic Society of the Netherlands site (2013).
 Conference summary:  La fabrication de la « grosse tête d’Hermès » de Grèce - Académie de Philatélie (2015, In French).
 Conference: La fabrication de la « grosse tête d’Hermès » de Grèce - Académie de Philatélie (2015, In French) - CPCT site.
 Exhibition : "La fabrication et l’utilisation postale des tirages de Paris de la grosse tête d’Hermès de Grèce" - Fédération Française des Associations Philatéliques - FFAP (2016, In French).
 Video of the conference: The "large Hermes head" dies, plates, die-proofs and plate-proofs - The Collectors Club, New York, USA (2016).
 Conference: The "large Hermes Head" dies, plates, die-proofs and plate-proofs - The Collectors Club, New York, USA (2016).
 Conference: Comment démarrer une collection de la « grosse tête d'Hermès » de Grèce - Académie de Philatélie (2018, In French) - CPCT site.
 Video of the conference: Comment démarrer une collection de la "grosse tête d'Hermès" de Grèce - Hellenic Philotelic Society of Athens - HPS (2019) - Philatélie Hellènique site
 Video of the conference: The fabrication of the "large Hermes head" (dies, plates, die-proofs & plate-proofs) - Hellenic Philotelic Society of Athens - HPS (2019) - Philatélie Hellènique site
  Philatelic forum for Greek classical period and all Greek stamps issues, including postal history. Greek and foreign countries philatelic bibliography as well (In Greek).
 Exhibit: "GREECE: Fabrication & Postal Usage of the Large Hermes Heads Paris printings" - Museum of Philately by David Feldman International Auctioneers (2021).
 Exhibit: "GREECE: Fabrication & Postal Usage of the Large Hermes Heads (1861-1901)" - Museum of Philately by David Feldman International Auctioneers (2021).
 Exhibit: "GREECE: The Fakes & Forgeries of the Large Hermes Heads" - Museum of Philately by David Feldman International Auctioneers (2021).
 Article: "The Synergy of France and Greece" - Museum of Philately by David Feldman International Auctioneers (2022).

Large Hermes Head - Postal History:
 Conference summary:  Un peu d'histoire postale la « grosse tête d'Hermès » de Grèce - Académie de Philatélie (2011, In French).
 Conference summary:  Au pied de la lettre - Académie de Philatélie (2011, In French).
 Exhibition: La « grosse tête d'Hermès » - Sélection de plis (1861-1901) - CIRP in Boulogne sur mer/France & Marcophilex XXXVI in Epernay/France - Association Philatélique Sparnacienne - APS (2012, In French).
 Conference summary: Dilemmes philatéliques - Académie de Philatélie (2012, In French).
 Conference summary: Les affranchissements partiels et la Grèce 1861-1875 - Académie de Philatélie (2015- In French).
 Presentation summary on pieces: Deux lettres « taxées » remarquables avec des « grosses têtes d’Hermès » de Grèce à l'Académie de Philatélie (2018 - In French).
 Presentation summary on piece: Quatre bateaux pour trois bajocchi à l'Académie de Philatélie (2019 - In French).
 Presentation summary on piece: Lettre d’Athènes pour Lyon du 2e semestre 1875 (2020 - In French).
 Exhibit: "GREECE: Fabrication & Postal Usage of the Large Hermes Heads Paris printings" - Museum of Philately by David Feldman International Auctioneers (2021).
 Exhibit : "GREECE: Fabrication & Postal Usage of the Large Hermes Heads (1861-1901)" - Museum of Philately by David Feldman International Auctioneers (2021).

Postage stamps of Greece
Philately of Greece